Summit is an unincorporated community in LaPorte County, Indiana, in the United States.

Summit was named for its lofty elevation.

References

Unincorporated communities in LaPorte County, Indiana
Unincorporated communities in Indiana